Ma Zhongchen (Chinese: 马忠臣; September 1936 – ) is a politician from the People's Republic of China. 

Ma was born in Taian, Shandong Province, and joined the Chinese Communist Party (CCP) in 1956.  In 1966, Ma became the vice Party chief of Taian County, Shandong. In June 1976, he became the Party chief and chairman of revolutionary commission of Zhangqiu County, Shandong.

In December 1992, Ma was appointed as the vice secretary of CCP Henan Committee, and the acting governor of Henan. He was confirmed as the governor of Henan in April, 1993. In March, 1998, Ma was elevated to the secretary of CCP Henan Committee.

Ma was an alternate member of 12th, 13th and 14th Central Committee of CCP, and a full member of 15th Central Committee.

References

1936 births
Living people
People's Republic of China politicians from Shandong
Chinese Communist Party politicians from Shandong
Politicians from Tai'an
Governors of Henan
CCP committee secretaries of Henan